
Restaurant De Vergulde Wagen is a defunct restaurant in Heemskerk, Netherlands. It was a fine dining restaurant that was awarded one Michelin star in 1995 and retained that rating until 1997. The restaurant closed in February 2011 when the owners retired after running the restaurants for 40 years. 

GaultMillau awarded the restaurant 12 out of 20 points in 2011.

Head chef of the restaurant was Tineke Nieuwenhuizen.

See also
List of Michelin starred restaurants in the Netherlands

References 

Restaurants in the Netherlands
Michelin Guide starred restaurants in the Netherlands
Defunct restaurants in the Netherlands
Heemskerk